"Ludens" is a song by British rock band Bring Me the Horizon. Produced by the band's vocalist Oliver Sykes and keyboardist Jordan Fish, it was released as the fifth single of the soundtrack Death Stranding: Timefall on 6 November 2019, and was featured as the first single from the group's 2020 commercial release Post Human: Survival Horror.

Promotion and release
On 1 October 2019, it was revealed that the video game Death Stranding was getting an official soundtrack album titled Death Stranding: Timefall after Scottish band Chvrches released their song "Death Stranding" as its lead single. Along with the announcement of the album, the track listing was revealed, which included the band's "Ludens".

On 4 November, the band shared a photo of a floppy disk-like device with the numbers 06.11.19 written on it, which is the British format for 6 November 2019. The next day, they revealed that "Ludens" would be on BBC Radio 1 with Annie Mac in promotion of the single.

Composition and lyrics
"Ludens" has been described by critics as being an electronic rock, pop rock, electropop, and a metalcore song. The song was written by the band's lead vocalist Oliver Sykes and keyboardist Jordan Fish, initially for the video game Death Stranding and its soundtrack Death Stranding: Timefall, but is also featured on the band's commercial release Post Human: Survival Horror. 

Sykes and Fish wrote and recorded the song in less than a week, with Sykes attributing the short deadline to "legal shit" with Sony and Kojima. Sykes requested an extension or an option to submit a placeholder demo instead, but both requests were declined. The song was created while the band was touring in Europe, with Sykes and Fish setting up temporary studios in hotel rooms. "Ludens" is the name of Kojima Productions' company icon and mascot. The tagline of Kojima Productions is 'From Sapiens to Ludens'. The Latin word 'Ludens' simultaneously refers to play and practice. More to it, the game character Die-Hardman wears a carbon skull mask with Ludens text on the forehead. However, the character is not present in Death Stranding. When asked about the identity of the mascot, Hideo Kojima responded:

Sykes has stated that musically the song was inspired by the 1999 film The Matrix and the nu metal and industrial metal that was featured on its official soundtrack. According to Sykes, the song's lyrics are centred around the human race and its ability to adapt while also tying into the themes of Death Stranding. The song's lyrics were partly inspired by environmental activist Greta Thunberg while lyrically, it is also a political song, as Sykes told NME:

Physical releases of Post Human: Survival Horror bear a different lyric in the second verse of the song. This alternative version of the song replaces the line "names can dig so many graves, you won't know where to stand" with the more graphic and potentially controversial line "names will make me blow the brains out of all the kids in class". The digital version of the song available on streaming services and online retailers contain the original line.

Commercial performance
"Ludens" entered the UK Singles Chart on 15 November 2019, peaking at number 75 for a solitary week. It, however, fared much better on the Scottish Singles Chart, peaking at number 53 and staying on the chart for three consecutive weeks. It simultaneously entered the UK Downloads and UK Singles Sales chart, both peaking at 45 for three total weeks on the charts respectively.

"Ludens" debuted and peaked on the UK Rock & Metal Singles Chart at number 2, being denied the top spot by Queen's "Bohemian Rhapsody". The song spent a total of seven consecutive weeks on the chart.

Music video
The music video for "Ludens" was released shortly after the single was initially streamed. Directed by Sykes himself, it features the band playing to a relatively small crowd while they mosh to the music and protest, with footage from the video game the song is based on, that being Death Stranding, being shown throughout the video. In the behind the scenes video for the song's music video, Sykes states:

Charts

Certifications

References

2019 singles
2019 songs
Bring Me the Horizon songs
Songs written by Oliver Sykes
Electronic rock songs
RCA Records singles
Sony Music singles